Jason and the G-Men was a contemporary Christian band from Minnesota founded in 1991 by Jason Harms, Greg Seeger, Rick McKinley and Rick Corliss.  The Encyclopedia of Contemporary Christian Music refers to them as possibly "Christian music's answer to Harry Connick Jr."

Their music was often compared to that of Frank Sinatra, Tony Bennett, or Gene Krupa. As these comparisons indicate their music was more connected with traditional, 1940s style swing than swing revival bands such as The Brian Setzer Orchestra, although their primary period of activity was linked to the latter. Within Christian music their act was relatively unique; according to one reviewer they compared only to a few tracks produced by Carman. Their albums featured reworked hymns, jazz standards and some original songs.

They opened for The Winans in 1992 and recorded a self-titled cassette only demo in the former studios of KTIS.  In 1993 they appeared at the Gospel Music Association's Music in the Rockies New Artists Showcase. True Tunes News gave them favorable reviews playing at Cornerstone in 1993. "G" as in Men was recorded live in concert in 1996 at Heritage Christian Center in Aurora, Colorado and MPR Studio "M" in St. Paul, Minnesota. Similarly, their 1999 release Swing Hard, Swing Often was recorded live. Jason and the G-Men disbanded in 2000, but Jason Harms continues to record with his brother Jesse Harms in a group called the Jason Harms Quartet

Members
Original
Jason Harms – Vocals, Guitar
Greg Seeger – Upright bass
Rick McKinley – Piano, Trombone
Rick Corliss – Drums

Subsequent / touring members
Jeremy Walker – Saxophone
Adrian Walker – Piano
Jesse Harms – Upright Bass, Vocals
Christopher Fashun – Vibes/Percussion
Dean Kleven – Piano
Jeff Brueske – Guitar
Isaac Harms – Drums
Paul Babcock – Drums
Don Stille – Piano
Gary Denbow – Saxophone

Discography
1992: Jason and the G-Men – Cassette-Only Demo; recorded in KTIS Studios
1994: Walkin' the Beat (Reviews:Cornerstone)
1996: "G" as in Men (Review: Cornerstone, The Phantom Tollbooth (2))
1999: Swing Hard, Swing Often (Review: The Phantom Tollbooth (3))

References

Performers of contemporary Christian music